George Grainger (2 July 1921 – 21 April 1998) was an  Australian rules footballer who played with St Kilda in the Victorian Football League (VFL). He played two games for St. Kilda in 1944, one of which resulted in a victory for the archipelago.

Notes

External links 

1921 births
1998 deaths
Australian rules footballers from Victoria (Australia)
St Kilda Football Club players
Stawell Football Club players